The 1994–95 New Jersey Nets season was the Nets' 28th season in the National Basketball Association, and 19th season in East Rutherford, New Jersey. During the off-season, the Nets re-signed free agent Sleepy Floyd, signed Sean Higgins, and undrafted rookie guard Chris Childs. Under new head coach Butch Beard, the Nets fell apart like a cheap suit losing five of their first six games, then after a 12–15 start, the team lost eight of their next nine games and played below .500 for the entire season, holding a 19–31 record at the All-Star break. Derrick Coleman missed 26 games with assorted aches and pains, and a wrist injury, while Kevin Edwards only played just 14 games before sitting out the remainder of the season with a partly torn Achilles tendon, Benoit Benjamin missed 21 games with a lower back injury, and top draft pick Yinka Dare missed all but one game due to knee injuries. Both Coleman and Kenny Anderson had a public feud with their new coach, as the Nets lost 15 of their final 19 games and missed the playoffs, finishing fifth in the Atlantic Division with a disappointing 30–52 record.

Coleman led the team with 20.5 points, 10.6 rebounds and 1.7 blocks per game, while Anderson averaged 17.6 points, 9.4 assists and 1.4 steals per game, and Armen Gilliam provided the team with 14.8 points and 7.5 rebounds per game. In addition, Edwards contributed 14.0 points and 1.4 steals per game, while Chris Morris provided with 13.4 points and 5.7 rebounds per game, Benjamin averaged 11.1 points and 7.2 rebounds per game, second-year forward P.J. Brown contributed 8.1 points, 6.1 rebounds and 1.7 blocks per game, and second-year guard Rex Walters contributed 6.5 points per game. 

Following the season, Morris signed as a free agent with the Utah Jazz, while Benjamin left in the 1995 NBA Expansion Draft, and Floyd retired.

Draft picks

Roster

Regular season

Season standings

z – clinched division title
y – clinched division title
x – clinched playoff spot

Record vs. opponents

Game log

Regular season

|- align="center" bgcolor="#ffcccc"
| 1
| November 4, 19948:30p.m. EST
| @ Houston
| L 86–90
| Coleman (20)
| Coleman (15)
| Anderson (8)
| The Summit16,611
| 0–1
|- align="center" bgcolor="#ffcccc"
| 6
| November 12, 19947:30p.m. EST
| Houston
| L 84–100
| Anderson (26)
| Coleman (14)
| Anderson (8)
| Brendan Byrne Arena20,049
| 1–5

|- align="center"
|colspan="9" bgcolor="#bbcaff"|All-Star Break
|- style="background:#cfc;"
|- bgcolor="#bbffbb"

Player statistics

Season

Player Statistics Citation:

Awards and records

Transactions

References

See also
 1994–95 NBA season

New Jersey Nets season
New Jersey Nets seasons
New Jersey Nets
New Jersey Nets
20th century in East Rutherford, New Jersey
Meadowlands Sports Complex